Favalli is an Italian surname. Notable people with the surname include:

Alessandro Favalli (born 1992), Italian footballer
Erminio Favalli (1944–2008), Italian footballer
Giuseppe Favalli (born 1972), Italian footballer
Lucas Favalli (born 1985), Argentine footballer
Pierino Favalli (1914–1986), Italian cyclist

Italian-language surnames